Longview High School (colloquially known as LHS) is a public high school located in the city of Longview, Texas, in Gregg County, United States and classified as a 5A school by the UIL.  It is a part of the Longview Independent School District located in eastern Gregg County.  The school was founded in 1874 as the Longview Male and Female Institute, and the first permanent structure was established in 1885.  In 2017, the school earned 7-out-of-7 distinctions from the Texas Education Agency.

Athletics 
The Longview Lobos compete in the following sports 

Baseball, Basketball, Cross Country, Football, Golf, Powerlifting, Soccer, Softball, Swimming & Diving, Tennis, Track & Field, and Volleyball

State Titles
Boys Basketball 
1992(5A)
Girls Basketball 
1984(5A)
Football 
1937(All)
2018(6A)

Notable alumni 

 Willie Andrews, former NFL safety for the New England Patriots
 Don Barton, former NFL halfback Green Bay Packers
 Jeb Blount, former NFL quarterback for the Tampa Bay Buccaneers and Oakland Raiders
 Shawn Byrdsong, football player
 Ron Cook, former Major League Baseball pitcher for Houston Astros
 Mike Clark, former NFL kicker for Pittsburgh Steelers, Philadelphia Eagles and Dallas Cowboys, Super Bowl VI champion
 Bobby Collier, former NFL player; Los Angeles Rams, 1951
 Chris Davis, MLB All-Star first baseman for Texas Rangers and Baltimore Orioles
 Don Fambrough, former head football coach at University of Kansas
 Tony Goolsby, former member of Texas House of Representatives from Dallas County
 Bruce Greer, award-winning musician, 1980
 Chubby Grigg, NFL former Cleveland Browns offensive and defensive tackle
 Kristy Hawkins, IFBB professional bodybuilder
 Robert Henson, NFL  Washington Redskins linebacker
 Eddie Hill, NHRA drag racing champion
 Travin Howard, NFL linebacker for the Los Angeles Rams
 Earnest Hunter, former running back for Cleveland Browns, Baltimore Ravens, New Orleans Saints, Barcelona Dragons
 Chris Ivory, former NFL running back for the Jacksonville Jaguars, New York Jets, New Orleans Saints and Buffalo Bills
 Malcolm Kelly, former NFL wide receiver for the Washington Redskins
 Don Menasco, former NFL defensive back for the New York Giants and Washington Redskins
 Matthew McConaughey, Academy Award-winning film actor
 Michael McDonald, former NBA center
 Diane Patrick, former member of Texas House of Representatives from Arlington
 Loyd Phillips, 2x time All-American at Arkansas
 Pete Robertson, NFL linebacker for the Seattle Seahawks, Washington Redskins, Arizona Cardinals , Saskatchewan Roughriders
 Josh Scobee, NFL Jacksonville Jaguars kicker
 James Street, football and baseball player for Texas Longhorns
 Bobby Taylor, NFL former NFL defensive back, Philadelphia Eagles
 Hosea Taylor former NFL defensive end, Baltimore Colts
 Fred Talley,  NFL Running Back Atlanta Falcons
 Jose Francisco Torres, Pachuca midfielder, U.S. men's national soccer team player
 Broderick Washington Jr. - Baltimore Ravens defensive tackle
 Rickey Watts - former NFL wide receiver for the Chicago Bears
 David Wesley - former NBA guard
 Trent Williams - NFL offensive tackle for the San Francisco 49ers

References

External links 
 Longview ISD 
 Lobo Football Website

Longview, Texas
Schools in Gregg County, Texas
Public high schools in Texas
International Baccalaureate schools in Texas
Educational institutions established in 1874
1874 establishments in Texas